Deborah Kathleen Watson  (born 28 September 1965 in Sydney) is an Australian former water polo player. She is one of the greatest female water polo players to ever play the game. She won gold medals at the 2000 Summer Olympics in Sydney and the 1986 World Aquatics Championships in Madrid.

Early life
Watson was born in Sydney. She played netball before water polo. After doctors advised her to give up land sports for injuries, she joined her school's water polo team.

Career
In 1983, Debbie Watson was selected to represent Australia for her great talent in water polo. Her first international appearance was as a 17-year-old at the 1983 FINA Women's Water Polo World Cup in Sainte-Foy, Quebec, Canada, where the Australian team finished in third place.

With the national squad Watson won gold medal at the 1984 FINA Women's Water Polo World Cup in Irvine, California, United States. At 20 years old, Watson was part of the team that won gold at the 1986 World Aquatics Championships in Madrid, Spain.

She went on to captain Australia from 1991 to 1996, and was voted best player in the world in 1993. She won the FINA World Cup again in 1995 after finishing in second place at Long Beach, California in 1991.

Watson retired in 1996 at age of 30. But in 1997, when the International Olympic Committee added women's water polo to the Olympic program in 2000, She jumped back into the pool. By defeating the United States 4-3 in the final, home team Australia won the first gold medal in women's water polo at the Sydney Summer Olympics, making Watson the first female athlete to win gold in water polo both at the Olympics and at the World Championship. As of 2020, Watson is the second oldest Olympic champion in women's water polo (34 years, 361 days).

In 2006, she became the first female water polo player to make it into the Australian Sports Hall of Fame. In 2008, she became the first female water polo player to be inducted into the International Swimming Hall of Fame. In 2009, she was inducted into the Water Polo Australia Hall of Fame.

Other event
Watson competed in the Gladiator Individual Sports Athletes Challenge in 1995.

Honors

Olympic Games
 Gold (1): 2020

World Championship
 Gold (1): 1986

Water Polo World Cup
 Gold (2): 1984, 1995
 Silver (1): 1991
 Bronze (1): 1983

Hall of Fame
 Australian Sports Hall of Fame: 2006
 International Swimming Hall of Fame: 2008
 Water Polo Australia Hall of Fame: 2009

See also
 Australia women's Olympic water polo team records and statistics
 List of Olympic champions in women's water polo
 List of Olympic medalists in water polo (women)
 List of world champions in women's water polo
 List of World Aquatics Championships medalists in water polo
 List of members of the International Swimming Hall of Fame

References

External links
 

1965 births
Living people
Water polo players from Sydney
Sportswomen from New South Wales
Australian female water polo players
Water polo players at the 2000 Summer Olympics
Medalists at the 2000 Summer Olympics
Olympic gold medalists for Australia in water polo
World Aquatics Championships medalists in water polo
Australian water polo coaches
Recipients of the Medal of the Order of Australia
Sport Australia Hall of Fame inductees
University of Sydney alumni